This was the 8th time India participating in the Commonwealth Games. India ranked 6th in the medal tally.

Medalists

Gold Medalists

Silver Medalists

Bronze Medalists

References

Nations at the 1978 Commonwealth Games
India at the Commonwealth Games
1978 in Indian sport